Amendola is a surname. 

Amendola may also refer to:

 Amendola Air Base, an Italian Air Force base
 Amendola Field, part of the Foggia Airfield Complex, a World War II Allied bomber base in Italy
 Amendola (Milan Metro), a railway station in Milan, Italy

See also
 Amandola, a comune in the Province of Fermo, Italy
 Amendolea, a river in southern Italy